The Bahujana Communist Party (BCP) is a political party in Telangana in India. The party is led by K.K. Niyogi. In 2019 the party joined hands with other left forces in the struggle against the NRC.

References

Political parties in Telangana
Communist parties in India
Political parties with year of establishment missing